The San Rafael Transportation Center (also called C. Paul Bettini Transportation Center) is an intermodal transportation center located in downtown San Rafael, California. It is a primary transfer point for several local and regional bus operators, and a commuter rail station on the Sonoma–Marin Area Rail Transit (SMART) system.

History

The original San Rafael railway depot that served the Northwestern Pacific Railroad was located at what is now a cafe north of the station. As rail use fell into decline and was discontinued in the mid-20th century, buses came to prominence with the expansion of the road and highway system. The current transportation center was constructed around the station building in 1991.

SMART testing began in March 2016. Service began with preview rides on July 8, 2017, and full service commenced on August 25, 2017.  The station acted as the southern terminal of the line until December 14, 2019, when the extension to Larkspur station opened. The bus terminal was reconfigured to allow the SMART tracks to pass through.

Marin Airporter service to the San Rafael Transit Center ended on October 6, 2019, due to traffic congestion around the transit center.

Services

San Rafael Transit Center has two side platforms serving the two tracks of the SMART mainline. The bus area, located south of the SMART platforms, has two side platforms and two island platforms.

San Rafael is the primary transfer point for Marin Transit, which operates local service plus two interurban routes. It is also served by several regional and intercity bus operators:
Marin Transit: 17, 22, 23, 23X, 29, 35, 36, 49, 68, 71X, 122, 125, 145, 228, 233, 245, 257
Golden Gate Transit: 101, 130, 132, 150, 580
Sonoma County Transit: 38
Sonoma County Airport Express
Greyhound Lines

References

External links

SMART - Stations
Greyhound - San Rafael

Bus stations in Marin County, California
Buildings and structures in San Rafael, California
Railway stations in the United States opened in 2017
2017 establishments in California
Sonoma-Marin Area Rail Transit stations in Marin County
San Francisco Bay Trail
Railway stations closed in 1958
1991 establishments in California
Former Northwestern Pacific Railroad stations